Treubiites kidstonii is a fossil species of liverworts in the family Treubiitaceae.  The only known fossils come from Late Carboniferous deposits of Shropshire, England.

References 

Blasiales
Liverwort genera
Carboniferous plants
Monotypic bryophyte genera
Prehistoric plant genera